Kim Clijsters was the defending champion, and successfully defended her title, defeating Patty Schnyder in the final 6–4, 6–2.

Seeds
The top four seeds received a bye into the second round.

Draw

Finals

Top half

Bottom half

References

External links
Main and Qualifying draws

Singles
Bank of the West Classic
Bank of the West Classic - Singles